The Roman Catholic Diocese of Manokwari–Sorong is a diocese located in the cities of Manokwari  and Sorong in the Ecclesiastical province of Merauke in Indonesia.

History
 19 December 1959: Established as the Apostolic Prefecture of Manokwari from the Apostolic Vicariate of Hollandia
 15 November 1966: Promoted as Diocese of Manokwari
 14 May 1974: Renamed as Diocese of Manokwari – Sorong

Leadership
 Bishops of Manokwari–Sorong (Roman rite)
 Bishop Datus Hilarion Lega (30 June 2003 – present)
 Bishop Francis Xavier Sudartanta Hadisumarta, O. Carm. (5 May 1988 – 30 June 2003)
 Bishop Petrus Malachias van Diepen, O.S.A. (14 May 1974 – 5 May 1988)
 Bishops of Manokwari (Roman Rite) 
 Bishop Petrus Malachias van Diepen, O.S.A. (15 November 1966 – 14 May 1974)
 Prefects Apostolic of Manokwari (Roman Rite) 
 Fr. Petrus Malachias van Diepen, O.S.A. (later Bishop) (12 February 1960 – 15 November 1966)

References
 GCatholic.org
 Catholic Hierarchy

Roman Catholic dioceses in Indonesia
Roman Catholic Diocese
Roman Catholic Diocese
Christian organizations established in 1959
Roman Catholic dioceses and prelatures established in the 20th century
1959 establishments in Indonesia